The Faculdade de Teologia Metodista Livre (Free Methodist College), also known as FTML or simply Metodista, is a private school based primarily in São Paulo, Brazil.

History
Metodista traces its history to 1956, when the Methodists created the Free Methodist Church (and the Theology College) in São Paulo.

Graduation programs
The school offers three degree programs at its São Paulo campus:
 Doctorate (Ph.D. / Th.D.)
 Master's degree
 Bachelor's degree (Theology)

External links
 Official site 

Methodist universities and colleges
Universities and colleges in São Paulo
Free Methodist Church
Methodist Free